Lukman Abdulkarim Haruna (born 4 December 1990) is a Nigerian former footballer who played as a midfielder.

Club career
In December 2007, AS Monaco signed Haruna on a four-year contract.

In June 2011, he signed a five-year contract with FC Dynamo Kyiv.

In July 2015, Haruna moved to FC Anzhi Makhachkala on a loan deal from Dynamo Kyiv until the end of 2015. Anzhi decided not to extend the loan after it ended.

On 3 April 2016, Haruna joined FC Astana on loan until 30 June 2016.

After trials with FK Vardar, RC Lens and Odense Boldklub, Haruna joined Lithuanian A Lyga club FK Palanga in March 2018.

In July 2019, Haruna joined Tunisian Ligue Professionnelle 1 club US Tataouine.

On 12 December 2019, FC Ararat Yerevan announced the signing of Haruna.

International career
Haruna was part of the Nigerian team that won the 2007 FIFA U-17 World Cup held in South Korea. In 2010, he was part of the Nigerian 23-man squad in the 2010 FIFA World Cup in South Africa.

Career statistics

Club

International

Statistics accurate as of match played 5 September 2015

Honours
Dynamo Kyiv
Ukrainian Cup: 2013–14

Astana
 Kazakhstan Premier League: 2016
 Kazakhstan Cup: 2016

Nigeria U17
 FIFA U-17 World Cup: 2007

References

External links
 
 
 SkySports Player Profile

1990 births
Living people
Nigerian expatriate footballers
Nigerian footballers
Nigeria youth international footballers
Nigeria under-20 international footballers
Nigeria international footballers
AS Monaco FC players
Ligue 1 players
Expatriate footballers in Monaco
FC Dynamo Kyiv players
Ukrainian Premier League players
Expatriate footballers in Ukraine
2010 FIFA World Cup players
FC Hoverla Uzhhorod players
FC Anzhi Makhachkala players
Expatriate footballers in Russia
Russian Premier League players
FC Astana players
Expatriate footballers in Kazakhstan
Nigerian expatriate sportspeople in Ukraine
Nigerian expatriate sportspeople in Russia
Nigerian expatriate sportspeople in Kazakhstan
Nigerian expatriate sportspeople in Monaco
Sportspeople from Lagos
Association football midfielders
A Lyga players
Kazakhstan Premier League players
Expatriate footballers in Armenia
Expatriate footballers in Lithuania